

The First Military Coup In Nigeria 
On January 15, 1966,Nigeria was jolted awake to the first Military Coup d'état, all over the top politicians were assassinated by young ambitious officers including the Prime Minister Sir Abubakar Tafawa Balewa, Sir Ahmadu Bello, Festus Okotie Eboh and Ladoke Akintola. The coup was masterminded by young majors as a result the coup often referred to as ""Coup of the five majors" spearheaded by Major Kaduna Nzeogwu. The mutineers overthrew several cities but were overpowered and imprisoned after two days.

A new government was formed and Johnson Aguyi- Ironsi became Head of State but six months later a counter coup took place where he and  his host  Francis Adekunle Fajuyi were assassinated. Yakubu Gowon was his successor.

Account of Occurrences that Followed 
An attack against those from Eastern Region ensued particularly those of Igbo descent as violence was unleashed on them. Chinua Achebe gave an excellent personal account of this happenings in his book "There was a Country'' .

He said, "It happened that my wife and I had moved recently from Milverton Street to Turnbull Road, after my promotion to director of external broadcasting.

Fortunately the soldiers went to our old house in search of me.

Some may wonder why the soldiers would be after me so fervently. As I mentioned, it happened that I had just written A Man Of The People, which forecasts a military coup that overthrows a corrupt civilian government.

Clearly a case of fact imitating fiction,

Nothing else.

But some military leaders believed that I must have had something to do with the coup and wanted to bring me in for questioning”

Victor Badejo, the director general of Nigerian Broadcasting Corporation, saw me on the premises, he stopped me, and said, “What are you still doing here?” and then said, “life has no duplicate” and then provided further clarification of the situation. Badejo, confirmed a story I had heard of drunken soldiers who came to my office “wanting to find out which was more powerful, their guns or my pen”

He was quite anxious on my behalf”

I decided the time had come for me to leave and head back to the East.

Source: There Was A Country - Chinua Achebe

Excerpts: Amanda Kirby Okoye
The Federal Public Service Commission relieved non Eastern Nigeria  Workers of their duties giving them  an ultimatum to return  to work or forfeit their jobs permanently they were 40 of them in number,  The men fled for because they feared for their safety in places where they working in other parts of the country during the disturbances. This was to be effective October 31, 1966.

Agriculture , Sport and Entertainment in 1966 
The Kano pyramids thrived and business boomed.  Nigeria had a mostly agrarian economy until the oil boom came. They were found mainly in Northern Nigeria and consisted of thousands of bags of groundnut. The Groundnut Pyramids brought quite a windfall of cash to the farmers and groundnut were exported.

Commonwealth Games November 1966 Nigerian athlete Sam Igun wins  gold in the sophisticated hop setting a new games record and putting Africa on the pedestal  of the world. The  medal had been won in  Kingston Jamaica.
'Joromi', the first Gold Record in Africa  won by  Sir Victor Uwaifo  was  presented to him by Mr. Jan Lewen the Managing director Philips Records West Africa in 1966.

Incumbents 
 President: 
 Until 16 January: Nnamdi Azikiwe 
 16 January – 29 July: Johnson Aguiyi-Ironsi
 29 July – 1 August: vacant
 Starting 1 August: Yakubu Gowon
 Prime Minister: 
 Until 15 January: Abubakar Tafawa Balewa
 Starting 16 January: position abolished
 Vice President: 
 Until 16 January: position not in existence
 16 January – 29 July: Babafemi Ogundipe
 Starting 29 July: Joseph Edet Akinwale Wey
 Senate President: 
 Until 15 January: Nwafor Orizu
 Starting 15 January: position abolished
 House Speaker:
 Until 15 January: Ibrahim Jalo Waziri
 Starting 15 January: position abolished
  Commissioner of Defence:
 Until 15 January: Inuwa Wada
 15 January – 29 July: vacant
 Starting 1 August: Yakubu Gowon
 Chief of Army Staff: 
 Until 15 January: Johnson Aguiyi-Ironsi
 15 January – 29 July: Yakubu Gowon
 Starting 29 July: Joseph Akahan
 Chief Justice: Sir Adetokunbo Ademola

Events

January
 January 10, 1966 — Diplomats of the British Commonwealth meet in Lagos to discuss the Rhodesian secession crisis.
January 15, 1966 — The first of many military coups in Nigeria deposes the Nigerian First Republic; Prime Minister Tafawa Balewa, was assassinated along with the premier of Northern Nigeria, Ahmadu Bello, and the Finance Minister, Festus Okotie-Eboh 
January 16, 1966 — The Federal Military Government is formed, with General Johnson Aguiyi-Ironsi as the Head of State and Supreme Commander of the Federal Republic.

July
 July 16, 1966 —The "Lagos Convention" calls for Nigeria's entry to the Common Market of the European Economic Community. Babafemi Ogundipe signs on behalf of the government. The convention will remain unratified and no agreement will go into effect until the signing of the Lomé Convention in 1976.
July 29, 1966 — A counter-coup by military officers of northern extraction, deposes the Federal Military Government; General Johnson Aguiyi-Ironsi is assassinated along with Adekunle Fajuyi, Military Governor of Western Region. General Yakubu Gowon becomes Head of State.

References 

 
Years of the 20th century in Nigeria
Nigeria